Wilfred Byron Shaw (1881–1959) was an American writer and sketch artist.

Early life 
He was born in 1881 in Adrian, Michigan, to Byron L. Shaw (1843–1933) and Olive Stockwell (1842–1919).

His father's brother was the farmer and artist Horatio Shaw.

Education 
Shaw graduated from the University of Michigan in 1904. He also attended art school in Chicago.

Career

University administration 
Soon after graduation, he was named the general secretary of the Alumni Association (a job he held until 1929) and editor of the Michigan Alumnus. In 1909, he accompanied President Harry Burns Hutchins (and other UM employees) on a trip to Chicago, Des Moines, and Omaha, to meet with UM alumni.

In 1912, he was part of the committee who approved maize and blue as official University of Michigan colors.

In 1913, he helped to organize the Association of Alumni Secretaries.

In 1929, he was appointed director of alumni relations, a position that the Regents established for continuing education and other services to graduates. He retired from this position in 1951.

Art 
Shaw was a talented sketch artist, often drawing university buildings for inclusion in the Ann Arbor News. Sixteen of his drawings are owned by the University of Michigan Museum of Art. His portrait of Fred Newton Scott is owned by the National Portrait Gallery.

He was also known for drawing caricatures of his colleagues. These are currently in storage at the Bentley Historical Library.

He also designed the logo for the University of Michigan's "atomic research center," the "Phoenix Project," in 1948.

Writing 
In 1918, Shaw published James Burrill Angell and the University of Michigan.

In 1920, Harcourt, Brace, and Howe published his book The University of Michigan, about the history of the university.

In 1934, Shaw founded and served as the first editor of the Michigan Alumnus Quarterly Review.

In 1936, he published "A Bibliography of the University of Michigan."

Personal life 
He married Marion B. Dickinson (1883–1958), and they had two children, Brackley Shaw (1913–1996) and Penelope Shaw (1921–1996).

References 

20th-century American artists
20th-century  American historians
Historians from Michigan
American illustrators
University of Michigan alumni
1881 births
1959 deaths
People from Adrian, Michigan
20th-century American writers
American male writers
American male artists
Male non-fiction writers
20th-century American male artists
Artists from Michigan
University of Michigan staff